North Star Deserter is a 2007 album by Vic Chesnutt. The backing musicians on the album are Guy Picciotto (guitarist and vocalist for the groups Rites of Spring and Fugazi) and Canadian Post-rock band, A Silver Mt. Zion. It was released on Constellation Records on August 27, 2007 (Europe), September 11, 2007 (rest of world)

Reception 

Metacritic gave North Star Deserter a score of 77 (generally favorable reviews).
The music review online magazine Pitchfork Media gave North Star Deserter a 7.6.

Track listing 
All songs written by Vic Chesnutt, except for the melody for "Glossolalia" composed by Jeff Mangum and "Fodder On Her Wings" by Nina Simone.
 "Warm" – 3:00
 "Glossolalia" – 3:32
 "Everything I Say" – 6:53
 "Wallace Stevens" – 2:17
 "You Are Never Alone" – 5:42
 "Fodder On Her Wings" – 3:12
 "Splendid" – 8:29
 "Rustic City Fathers" – 4:23
 "Over" – 4:00
 "Debriefing" – 8:27
 "Marathon" – 5:34
 "Rattle" – 1:29

References 

2007 albums
Vic Chesnutt albums
Constellation Records (Canada) albums
Collaborative albums
Thee Silver Mt. Zion albums